Bayat e Turk (Persian:بیات ترک) or Bayat e Zand (Persian:بیات زند) is a part of Dastgah-e Shur in Iranian traditional music. Some religious texts like Adhan are sung in this mode.

Etymology 
The term "Turk" refers to the Turkic Qashqai people of Southern Iran, and does not refer to Turkmen People or Azeri People. This is thought to be because the folk songs of the Qashqai tribe are often sung in this manner.

Branches 
This mode has some branches including:
 Daramad e Avval (first preface)
 Daramad Dovvom (second preface)
 Daramad Sevvom (third preface)
 Dogah
 Ruholarwah
 Jame daran
 Mahdizarrabi
 Zangooleh
 Bastenegar
 Naghme
 Feili
 Khosrawani
 Haji Hassani
 Mehrabani

References 

Iranian music
Radif (music)